Konris Maynard, or King Konris born 8 July 1983 on the island of St. Kitts, is most notable for having won the Saint Kitts and Nevis National Calypso Show four times in succession, a record only he holds.  Maynard also won a fifth crown, to celebrate the Silver Jubilee of the Independence of Saint Kitts and Nevis.

In the 2015 Saint Kitts and Nevis general election Maynard was elected to represent the constituency of St Christopher #3.  He sits as a member of the opposition Saint Kitts and Nevis Labour Party.

On 15 August 2022, he joined the Drew ministry as Minister of Public Infrastructure and Utilities, Transport, Information, Communication and Technology and Post.

See also
 List of University of Waterloo people

External links
 Festival biography

Notes

Calypsonians
Living people
Members of the National Assembly (Saint Kitts and Nevis)
People from Saint Kitts
Saint Kitts and Nevis Labour Party politicians
Saint Kitts and Nevis musicians
Year of birth missing (living people)

Government ministers of Saint Kitts and Nevis